H46 may refer to:
 Boeing Vertol H-46 Sea Knight, an American helicopter
 Hanriot H.46 Styx, a French aircraft
 , a Royal Navy Clemson-class destroyer